M. Sam Mannan (November 10, 1954 – September 11, 2018) was an American chemical engineer who was professor of chemical engineering at Texas A&M University. He was also the Director of the Mary Kay O'Connor Process Safety Center of the Texas A&M Engineering Experiment Station.

Early life and education
Mannan was born in Comilla, Bangladesh, in 1954. He earned his bachelor's degree in 1978 from the Bangladesh University of Engineering and Technology in Dhaka. Then he went on to the University of Oklahoma, where he earned a master's degree (1983) and Ph.D. (1986) in chemical engineering.

Professional life
After graduating in 1986, Mannan was hired as an assistant professor with the School of Chemical Engineering and Materials Science at the University of Oklahoma. He remained at the University of Oklahoma until 1990, when he became the Division Director for RMT, Inc., a nationwide engineering services company. In 1994, he was appointed Vice President of RMT, Inc.

With encouragement from his mentor Trevor Kletz, Mannan left industry in 1997 to accept the position of  Director of the Mary Kay O'Connor Process Safety Center and Associate Professor at Texas A&M University. He was a registered professional engineer in the states of Texas and Louisiana and was a Certified Safety Professional.

External links
 Mary Kay O'Connor Process Safety Center
 Artie McFerrin Department of Chemical Engineering
 Texas A&M Engineering Experiment Station

References

1954 births
2018 deaths
University of Oklahoma alumni
American chemical engineers
Texas A&M University faculty
American people of Bangladeshi descent
People from Comilla